Do Jhoot is a 1975 Bollywood romance film directed by Jitu Thakar. The film stars Vinod Mehra, Ajit and Moushumi Chatterjee in lead roles.

Cast
Vinod Mehra as Sanjay  
Moushumi Chatterjee as Lajwanti / Vandana  
Aruna Irani as Rekha   
Ajit as Nathulal   
Kamini Kaushal as Lalita / Usha    
Pran as Chaudhary Pratap Rai   
Prem Chopra as Shailesh

Awards 
 23rd Filmfare Awards:

Won

 Best Art Direction – Bansi Chandragupta

Nominated

 Best Supporting Actor – Pran
 Best Supporting Actress – Aruna Irani

Soundtrack

External links

References

1975 films
1970s Hindi-language films
Films scored by Shankar–Jaikishan
Indian romance films